Katrina Vandenberg is an American poet.

Career
Vandenberg is the author of two books of poetry and one chapbook. Her work has been called "emotionally resonant and intellectually ambitious." Her first book, Atlas, was a finalist for the Minnesota Book Award in 2005. A reviewer described her second collection of poetry, The Alphabet Not Unlike the World, as "taking thoughts about everyday stories and experiences and weaving them into profound poetic portraits about the larger things in life." She is an Associate Professor of creative writing at Hamline University in Saint Paul, Minnesota.

Publications

Poetry collections
The Alphabet Not Unlike the World (Milkweed Editions, 2012)
Atlas (Milkweed Editions, 2004)

Chapbooks
On Marriage (with Todd Boss; Red Dragonfly Press, 2008)

References

External links
Personal website

Living people
21st-century American poets
Year of birth missing (living people)
American women poets
Hamline University faculty
21st-century American women